Pete Biagi (born 1963) is a cinematographer. His work includes numerous short films and eighteen feature-length films. He has also shot local commercials and national commercials. He won Intercom's Best Cinematography Award, an AICP Award, and an Indy Award. He was featured in the first season of HBO's Project Greenlight while working as the cinematographer for the film Stolen Summer.

Filmography

Films

TV Series

References

External links

American cinematographers
1963 births
Living people